Wyatt Knight (January 20, 1955 – October 25, 2011) was an American actor, best known for his role as Tommy Turner in the Porky's trilogy.

Career
In addition to his work in the Porky's films, Knight made guest appearances on numerous TV shows including The Waltons, M*A*S*H, Family Ties, Profiler, Chicago Hope and Star Trek: The Next Generation. His final TV appearance came in 2010 on the show Crafty.

Death
According to Knight's wife Silvina, in a statement given to entertainment news website TheWrap, he had a bone marrow transplant for advanced non-Hodgkin's lymphoma in 2003. However, intense cancer treatment including radiation left him, in the words of his wife, "in physical and emotional pain."  On October 26, 2011 Wyatt Knight's body was discovered in a remote area on the island of Maui, Hawaii. Knight was a resident of Los Angeles, California but had recently been staying at a house on Maui.

According to the Associated Press, autopsy results indicated Knight died of a self-inflicted gunshot wound. In addition to his wife, Knight was survived by two children from a previous marriage.

Filmography

References

External links
 

 

1955 births
2011 deaths
American male film actors
American male television actors
Suicides by firearm in Hawaii
Place of birth missing
2011 suicides
20th-century American male actors